Battle of Bekeriyah was a major battle of the Saudi–Rashidi War, during the Unification of Saudi Arabia campaign, between Rashidi and Saudi rebels. It occurred in July 1904 at the town of Bekeriyah in Qassim region. After Ibn Saud's victory in the Battle of Dilam, Ibn Saud tried to expand his power by capturing Qassim, weakening his Rashidi enemies and their Ottoman allies. The battle ended in Saudi victory with heavy casualties on both sides.

Notes

References
 Battle of Bekeriyah, Arabic Wikipedia

Bekeriyah 1904
Bekeriyah 1904
1904 in Saudi Arabia